Hi, Beautiful is a 1944 American comedy film directed by Leslie Goodwins and written by Dick Irving Hyland. The film stars Martha O'Driscoll, Noah Beery Jr., Hattie McDaniel, Walter Catlett, Tim Ryan, Florence Lake, Grady Sutton, Lou Lubin and Virginia Sale. The film was released on December 18, 1944, by Universal Pictures.

Plot

Cast        
Martha O'Driscoll as Patty Callahan
Noah Beery Jr. as Jeff Peters
Hattie McDaniel as Millie
Walter Catlett as Gerald Bisbee
Tim Ryan as Babcock
Florence Lake as Mrs. Bisbee
Grady Sutton as Attendant
Lou Lubin as Louis
Virginia Sale as Wife
Tom Dugan as Bus Driver
Dick Elliott as Passenger
Jimmie Dodd as Soldier

References

External links
 

1944 films
American comedy films
1944 comedy films
Universal Pictures films
Films directed by Leslie Goodwins
American black-and-white films
1940s English-language films
1940s American films